Ágoston Valentiny (6 October 1888 – 21 August 1958) was a Hungarian politician and jurist, who served as Minister of Justice in the Interim National Government. He was born into a working-class family with six children. His father was a machine fitter and engineer. Valentiny finished his law studies in Kolozsvár. He joined the Hungarian Social Democratic Party on 1 January 1919. During the German occupation in 1944 he was interned. After the "Liberation" of Szeged he became mayor of the town. He was a member of the Interim National Assembly.

After the 1945 elections he had to resign from the ministerial position because of the communists' attacks. After that he worked as a lawyer. He was arrested and sentenced in a show trial in 1950. He was set free after five years. After his death he was rehabilitated.

References
 Magyar Életrajzi Lexikon

1888 births
1958 deaths
Justice ministers of Hungary
Members of the National Assembly of Hungary (1945–1947)